Hot Country Songs is a chart that ranks the top-performing country music songs in the United States, published by Billboard magazine.  In 1974, 41 different singles topped the chart, which at the time was published under the title Hot Country Singles, in 52 issues of the magazine, based on playlists submitted by country music radio stations and sales reports submitted by stores.

At the start of the year, the number one song on the chart was "If We Make It Through December" by Merle Haggard, the song's third week in the top spot.  Charlie Rich had the most number ones of 1974, taking five different songs to the top spot, followed by Dolly Parton, who had three solo chart-toppers and one in collaboration with her long-time mentor Porter Wagoner.  Wagoner and Parton had charted with a number of duets since 1967, but "Please Don't Stop Loving Me" was their only number one as a duo.  In 1973, Parton had taken the decision to end her working relationship with Wagoner, which served as the inspiration for the song "I Will Always Love You", one of her three solo number ones of 1974.  In 1982 she re-recorded the song and it once again went to number one, making her the first artist to top the country chart with two different recordings of the same song.  Wagoner and Parton's chart-topper was one of two male-female duets to reach number one in 1974, the other being Conway Twitty and Loretta Lynn's "As Soon as I Hang Up the Phone".  Twitty and Lynn had a run of success with duet recordings in the early 1970s alongside their ongoing solo careers.

In addition to having the most individual chart-toppers, Charlie Rich also spent the highest total number of weeks at number one during the year.  The singer nicknamed the "Silver Fox" spent eight weeks in the top spot with "There Won't Be Anymore", "A Very Special Love Song", "I Don't See Me in Your Eyes Anymore", "I Love My Friend" and "She Called Me Baby", all of which also crossed over to Billboard all-genre singles chart, the Hot 100; no other artist spent more than four weeks atop the country listing.  A fifteen-year veteran of the music industry, Rich had finally achieved stardom in both the country and pop markets in the early 1970s and was at the peak of his success in 1974, but changing musical tastes and increasing personal problems led to him largely retiring at the end of the decade.  In June, Ronnie Milsap had his first number one with "Pure Love".  He would go on to become one of the most successful country performers of the 1970s and 1980s, topping the Hot Country Singles chart more than 30 times.  In the same month, Waylon Jennings reached number one for the first time with "This Time".  Jennings would go on to become one of the mainstays of the successful outlaw country movement of the late 1970s and, like Milsap, is a member of the Country Music Hall of Fame.  A third future Hall of Fame inductee to top the chart for the first time in 1974 was Bobby Bare, who achieved the only number one of his lengthy career in July with "Marie Laveau".  Mickey Gilley, Billy Swan, Melba Montgomery and Billy "Crash" Craddock were also first-time chart-toppers in 1974.  The final number one of the year was "What a Man My Man Is" by Lynn Anderson.

Chart history

See also
1974 in music
List of artists who reached number one on the U.S. country chart

References

1974
1974 record charts
Country